The Vickers .50 machine gun, also known as the 'Vickers .50' was similar to the  Vickers machine gun but enlarged to use a larger-calibre  round. It saw some use in tanks and other fighting vehicles but was more commonly used as a close-in anti-aircraft weapon on Royal Navy and Allied ships, typically in a four-gun mounting (UK) or two-gun mounting (Dutch). The Vickers fired British .50 Vickers (12.7×81mm) ammunition, not the better known American .50 BMG (12.7×99mm).

Mark I
The Mark I was the development model.

Mark II, IV and V
The Mark II entered service in 1933 and was mounted in some British light tanks. Marks IV and V were improved versions and were also used on trucks in the North Africa Campaign. It was superseded for use in armoured fighting vehicles (AFVs) during the Second World War by the  Besa.

Mark III

The Mark III was a naval version used as an anti-aircraft weapon, mostly by the Royal Navy and allied navies in the Second World War, typically in mountings of 4 guns. It proved insufficiently powerful at short-range against modern all-metal aircraft and was superseded during the Second World War by the Oerlikon 20 mm cannon. The naval quad mount featured a 200-round magazine per barrel, which wrapped the ammunition belt around the magazine drum and provided a maximum rate of fire of 700 rounds per minute, per gun. Vickers claimed that it could fire all 800 rounds in 20 seconds and could then be reloaded in a further 30 seconds. During the Second World War it was also mounted on power-operated turrets (usually a twin-gun mount) in smaller craft such as motor gunboats and motor torpedo boats.

See also
 M2 Browning
 Pom-pom

Notes

References

Bibliography
 The Vickers Machine Gun
 Tony DiGiulian, British 0.50"/62 (12.7 mm) Mark III
 Anthony G Williams, THE .5" VICKERS GUNS AND AMMUNITION

External links

12.7 mm machine guns
12.7×81 mm firearms
Aircraft guns
Tank guns
Vickers
Machine guns of the United Kingdom
World War II naval weapons of the United Kingdom
World War II machine guns